Operation Prairie Flat was a test involving the detonation of a  spherical surface charge of TNT to evaluate airblast, ground shock and thermal effects of nuclear weapons.

Since TNT charges produce roughly double the airburst effect of nuclear weapons, it allowed testing the equivalent of a  nuclear weapon surface burst. It was a continuation of the technical co-operation (Canada, United States, Great Britain) series of tests sponsored jointly by the respective governments. Similar to previous tests, a large number of projects were carried out simultaneously due to the infrequent opportunity and cost of large explosives tests – the United States alone conducted 39 projects. The resulting airblast also allowed testing various targets at a range of overpressures to verify how structures resist effects of nuclear weapons. These included troop field shelters, fiberglass manholes, foxhole overhead covers, blast valves and electrical generators. Debris fracturing and transport were also tested as part of the effort to understand nuclear blast effects on Nike-X anti-ballistic missile sites. An additional goal of the test was to compare the blast with the previous Distant Plain Event 6 that used an equivalent but smaller  configuration in order to study scaling factors.

Test
The test was performed at 11:00 MST on August 9, 1968, at the Watching Hill blast range of the Defence Research Establishment Suffield, a permanent facility able to carry out large high explosive (HE) test up to 500 tons operated by the Defence Research Board. The charge was constructed of 31,676 blocks of TNT of various sizes mainly the 12x12x4 inch typically used in HE tests. Unlike previous 500-ton tests however, the charge was built as a sphere tangent to the ground, which would make it smaller in diameter than the 500-ton hemispheres but equal in yield. Detonation was accomplished with CE/TNT boosters placed in the center. The sphere was supported by styrofoam rings and blocks and once completed resembled a hemisphere atop a cylinder. After detonation, the flame front reached the charge surface in approximately half a second and produced a fireball and destructive overpressures.

References 

DRDC Suffield
Explosions in Canada
Explosions in 1968
1968 in Canada
Military projects of the United States
1968 in military history
Prairie Flat